60th General Assembly of Nova Scotia represented Nova Scotia from 2006 to 2009. Its membership was determined in the 2006 Nova Scotia election. The Progressive Conservative Party of Nova Scotia led by Rodney MacDonald formed a minority government.

The first session met from June 29, 2006 to July 14, 2006, October 30, 2006 to November 23, 2006, January 8, 2006 to January 11, 2006, March 19, 2007 to April 13, 2007 and October 27, 2007 to November 22, 2007.

The second session met from November 22, 2007 to December 13, 2007, April 24, 2008 to May 27, 2008, October 30, 2008 to November 25, 2008, and May 1, 2009 to May 5, 2009, when the government was defeated on a money bill.

Seating plan

Division of seats

List of members

 elected in by-election on October 2, 2007
 resigned from cabinet and from the Progressive Conservative caucus on January 4, 2007
 vacancy caused by the death of Michael Baker on March 2, 2009

External links
 Hansard of the 60th General Assembly, 1st Session 
 Hansard of the 60th General Assembly, 2nd Session 

Terms of the General Assembly of Nova Scotia
2006 establishments in Nova Scotia
2009 disestablishments in Nova Scotia